This is a list of television channels in the Syriac-Aramaic language.

Ashur TV
Assyria TV
Assyrian National Broadcasting (ANB) 
Ishtar TV
KBSV
Suboro TV
Suroyo TV
Suryoyo Sat

Aramaic